Hoàng Văn Thái (1 May 1915 – 2 July 1986), born Hoàng Văn Xiêm, was a Vietnamese Army General and a communist political figure. His hometown was Tây An, Tiền Hải District, Thái Bình Province.  During the Tết Offensive, he was the highest senior North Vietnamese officer in South Vietnam. He was the first chief of staff of the Vietnam People's Army, and was responsible for key military forces in North Vietnam. He was also Chief of Staff in the Battle of Điện Biên Phủ.

Early life 
Hoàng Văn Thái was born Hoàng Văn Xiêm, on 1 May 1915 (or 1917 since his older brother was born in 1915), in the village of An Khang (now Tay An, Tiền Hải District, Thái Bình Province). His father, Hoàng Văn Thuật, was a Han Nom teacher.

The third born of seven siblings, Hoàng Văn Thái was dedicated to studying and graduated from a French-Vietnamese colonial elementary school, however, he dropped out of school at the age of 13 because of financial difficulties; Xiêm had to work as a barber. At the age of 15, he was influenced by a Communist movement.

At the age 18, Hoàng Văn Thái worked in a mine in Hồng Gai in Quảng Ninh Province, he attended movements against the unfairness of the mine owners and returned to his hometown in 1936.

In 1938 he joined the Communist Party of Indochina. Trailed by the colonial authorities, he fled to the Republic of China in 1941. There, he was educated at a military academy in Guilin. In 1944 he returned to Vietnam where he was employed for propaganda and intelligence purposes of the forming Việt Minh. In December 1945 he became Chief of Staff of the Việt Minh forces. In 1948 he was promoted to major general. Hoàng Văn Thái was dismissed as Chief of Staff shortly before the beginning of the Battle of Điện Biên Phủ. His successor was Văn Tiến Dũng.

In January 1948 Hoàng Văn Thái was promoted to one of the first generals of Vietnam. On August 31, 1959, he was promoted to the rank of lieutenant general. In 1966 he was assigned as Commander and Political Commissar to the Military Region V. From 1967 to 1973, when he was assigned to the south, he was commander of the South Vietnamese Liberation Army and the deputy COSVN. At the Battle of Loc Ninh he was Commanding Officer (27 October 1967 – 10 December 1967), also during the Tet Offensive in January 1968. In April 1974 he was promoted to the rank of colonel general. He was appointed Deputy Minister of Defense, First Deputy Chief of the General Staff and permanent member of the Central Military Committee. In January 1980 he was promoted to general. He was a member of the Central Committee of the Communist Party of Vietnam and delegate of the 7th Party Congress. On July 2, 1986, he died suddenly after a heart attack in Army Hospital 108.

He opened a music class to organise young men to participate in rebellious activities. After few months, students were numbered to 170 members with himself as a secretary. Through experiences gained from secret activities, he spread leaflets on the sly in order to encourage people to get involved against high taxes, struggling for democratic freedom.

Early service in military 
In 1941, Việt Minh was founded, he became  a commander of the squad National Salvation Army Bắc Sơn (Lạng Sơn). Under the name of Quoc Binh, meaning "peaceful country", several comrades and he left for military training in Liuzhou, China.

In late 1943, he met with Ho Chi Minh, then released by the Chiang Kai-shek government. After military school he returned to Vietnam with a new assumed name Hoang Van Thai (Thai stems from his hometown Thái Bình, also meaning "peaceful"), joined the resistance against Japan and then joined the August Revolution against France in 1945.  He also was one of 34 soldiers led by Võ Nguyên Giáp that met on 22 December 1944 to found the Armed Propaganda Unit for National Liberation that later became the Vietnam People's Army. Thai was assigned to be in charge of propaganda and agitation of the newly organisation. 

In March 1945, he commanded a group of 100 members to advance to Chợ Đồn District to form a foundation in the area. In the meantime, the Japanese led a coup d'état against the French authority. French units dispersed and fled to China later on. Việt Minh cadres with the help of the PAVN quickly formed a new authority and established training. Thai, subsequently, took order from Võ Nguyên Giáp to hand over the area to the local Việt Minh cadres and continued to lead members down to Cho Chu, Tuyên Quang, supporting as well as training self-defence units and political cadre groups.

In April 1945, the Northern Military Meeting determined the merging of several groups, including the Vietnam People's Army, into the Vietnam Liberation Army (Việt Nam Giải Phóng Quân). Vietnam Liberation Army was considered as the main force of Việt Minh. At the same time, the Political-Military Japanese Resistance school (Trường Quân chính kháng Nhật) was established in Tan Trao. Thai was assigned as the principal in charge of educating army staffs for the Vietnam Liberation Army.

The First Indochina War 
On 7 September 1945, The President of the Provisional Government of Democratic Republic of Vietnam, Ho Chi Minh mandated the foundation of a General Staff and appointed Thai as the Chief of General Staff. Under this mandate,  Thai was assigned as the first Chief of General Staff of the Vietnam People's Army. (1945–1953), by President Ho Chi Minh of the Provisional Government at the age of 30.

On 22 May 1946, the National Guard was renamed as Vietnamese National Army, officially becoming a regular army placed under the control of the General Staff. In the meantime, although Ho–Sainteny agreement and Provisional 14 September agreement were signed and being active, but the French put pressure by force on the newly government to reattain French Indochina. As the Chief of General Staff of the Vietnamese National Army, Thai organised the army personnel and established armed forces as well as paramilitaries in countrysides and defence forces in cities. By the end of 1946, approximately 1 million militias were organised and trained in preparation for war while every diplomatic means failed.

When French troops provoked in Hai Phong, Thai directly commanded the front in Hai Phong from the 20th to 27th in November 1947. Vietnamese Nationwide Resistance broke out in Hanoi, Thai and Võ Nguyên Giáp were the ones that approved operational plans of the Hanoi front leader Vuong Thua Vu. The plans proposed a firm deployment restraining the French from moving forward as well as decreasing the number of French troops in the city within 2 months.

After baffling the French attempt, on 26 August 1947, a major Division regarded as Independence Division was created. Chief of General Staff Hoang Van Thai was assigned as a commander. However, on 7 October, the French launched the Operation Léa attacking Việt Bắc base. Units that had been organised to form Division previously had to disperse into small fronts. Thai was assigned to play a role as the commander of the Route Coloniale 3 front. Eventually, Operation Léa resulted in French limited success and Vietnamese strategic victory.

In January 1948, he was promoted as one of the first Generals of Vietnam, along with: General Võ Nguyên Giáp, Lieutenant General Nguyễn Bình, and Major Generals: Nguyễn Sơn, Chu Văn Tấn, Hoang Sam, Trần Đại Nghĩa, Le Hien Mai, Văn Tiến Dũng, Trần Tử Bình, Le Thiet Hung, Duong Van Duong (died in 1946).

In 1950, he was Chief of Staff of Borders campaign and the Commanding Officer in the Battle of Đông Khê, which opened the campaign.

Campaign in First Indochina War 
Campaigns that Thai participated in as the Chief of General Staff (with Võ Nguyên Giáp playing the role of a commander) in the First Indochina War:
 Operation Léa, autumn-winter 1947.
 Battle of Route Coloniale 4, September–October 1950.
 Battle of Vĩnh Yên, December 1950.
 Battle of Hoang Hoa Tham, 1951.
 Battle of Hà Nam Ninh, May 1951.
 Battle of Hòa Bình, December 1951.
 Battle of Northwest, September 1952.
 Battle of Upper Laos, April 1953.
 Battle of Dien Bien Phu, March to May 1954.

Battle of Dien Bien Phu 
In 1953, Major General Văn Tiến Dũng, then Commander of 320th Division, was recalled to Việt Bắc to assume the Chief of General Staff position. Thai was assigned as Deputy Chief of General Staff. In fact, he was appointed as Special Campaign Chief of Staff Điện Biên Phủ, assistant to the Commander in Chief Võ Nguyên Giáp. On 26 November 1953, he led a group of General Staff cadres to Tây Bắc.

On 30 November 1953, the group arrived in Nà Sản, he ordered the group to halt to investigate entrenched fortifications that the French had left earlier in August. The group began making operational plans in a bit later on. On 12 January 1954, Võ Nguyên Giáp's group arrived.

Following the victory of Việt Minh in Dien Bien Phu, Geneva Conference was signed, ending 80 years of French presence in Vietnam.

In Vietnam War 

On 31 August 1959, he was one of four people to be proposed for Colonel General rank, but he refused. He eventually was promoted to the rank of Lieutenant General.

In 1960 to 1965, he held the position of chairman of the Committee for Physical Training and Sports of the Government, which was involved in military training.

In March 1965, the first US troops were sent to Đà Nẵng, marked the official appearance of the Americans in South Vietnam. North Vietnam decided to send one of its most important seniors to the south, trying to balance the difficulty. Thai was assigned as Commander and Political Commissar of the 5th Military Region in 1966.

From 1967 to 1973, he was assigned to the South, made Commander of the People's Liberation Armed Forces and Deputy Secretary of COSVN. The US army called him a "3 legged tiger", the highest Northern commander in the South during the war years under the name of Muoi Khang.

During the time, he was the leader of First Battle of Loc Ninh Commanding Officer (27 October 1967 – 10 December 1967). Also on 30 January 1968, he was the main commander of events during the Tet offensive throughout South Vietnam under instructions from the North.

After the war 
In 1974, he was promoted to the rank of colonel general and was appointed Deputy Minister of Defense, and First Deputy Chief of the General Staff, Standing member of the Central Military Committee. After 1975, he was also proposed to be a member of the Politburo; however, he refused.

In January 1980, he was promoted to full Army General.

He was a member of III, IV, and V Central Committee of the Communist Party of Vietnam, and a member of the VII Congress.

On 2 July 1986, he died suddenly of a heart attack at the Army Medical Institute 108 before he would have been promoted as the Minister of Defense, the first chairman of the Vietnam National Security Council (responsible for national security, home affair, and foreign policy matters. However, the position was rejected and has never been active since his death), some considered this event as an assassination as well as general Lê Trọng Tấn's death in the same year of 1986. Although he did not officially become the 7th minister of defence,  Thai, in fact had been the acting minister before the transition of power that should have occurred in December 1986.

Awards and honours 
Streets that are named after Hoang Van Thai are in
 Thanh Xuân District, Hanoi
 Điện Biên Phủ, Điện Biên Province
 Phú Thọ Province
 Thái Bình, Thái Bình Province
 Tiền Hải District, Thái Bình Province
 Liên Chiểu District, Da Nang
 Nha Trang, Khánh Hòa Province
 Pleiku, Gia Lai Province
 Đồng Xoài, Bình Phước Province
 Tân Châu District, Tây Ninh Province
 District 7, Ho Chi Minh City

Vietnam orders and decorations 
 Gold Star Order (posthumously)
 Ho Chi Minh Order
 Military Exploit Order (2)
 Resolution for Victory Order
 Resistance Order (2)
 Liberation Order (3)
 Glorious Fighter Medal (3)
 Determined-to-Win Military Flag Medal

Vietnam badges 
 40 Years Communist Party Membership Medal (1938–1978)
 "Dien Bien soldiers" badges

Foreign orders and decorations 
 Order of the Red Banner
 USSR Brotherhood in Arms Medal
 USSR Jubilee Medal
 Czechoslovak Meritorious Fighters against Fascism Medal
 Polish Brotherhood in Arms Medal
 Laos Freedom Medal

Foreign badges 
 50th Anniversary Of The D.O.S.A.A.F.
 USSR 40 years of the Great Victory on 9 May
 60 Years of the Armed Forces of the Mongolian People's Republic
 People's Republic of Kampuchea's Fifth Anniversary of the Seventh of January Badge

Personal life 
Hoàng Văn Thái's first wife was Lương Thị Thanh Bình, a native of Thái Bình Province, who was involved in revolutionary activities with Thai. They were married in 1939. In the middle of 1940, Thai was captured and taken into custody. He escaped later on with help from his wife, he then fled to Bắc Giang and used an assumed name to conceal himself. They lost touch with each other until 1946. They had 2 children.

His second wife was Đàm Thị Loan, a former Tay Lieutenant Colonel in the People's Army of Vietnam. She was one of three female soldiers in the original Vietnam Armed Propaganda Unit for National Liberation and was in the honour guard hoisting the flag of the new independent country in the Independence ceremony held at  Ba Dinh Square on 2 September 1945. They married on 15 September 1945. They had 6 children.

Thai was fluent in Mandarin, as well as proficient in writing Nôm, and was known to have a good command of  Tày, and Nùng. He knew a little French, Russian and English.

Thai's height was 1.75 meters (approx. 5 ft 9), higher than the average height of Vietnamese people in the 20th century.

References 

1915 births
1986 deaths
Members of the 3rd Central Committee of the Workers' Party of Vietnam
Members of the 4th Central Committee of the Communist Party of Vietnam
Members of the 5th Central Committee of the Communist Party of Vietnam
Generals of the People's Army of Vietnam
Government ministers of Vietnam
Guerrilla warfare theorists
North Vietnamese military personnel of the Vietnam War
People from Thái Bình province
People from Quảng Bình province
People of the First Indochina War
Viet Minh members
Vietnamese people of World War II
Recipients of the Order of Ho Chi Minh
Vietnamese nationalists
Recipients of the Order of the Red Banner